Westwind has been the name of one ship of the United States Navy and one ship of the United States Coast Guard. 

 , a Wind-class icebreaker of the United States Coast Guard.

United States Navy ship names